Rizo is a Spanish surname.

Rizo may also refer to:

People
Lady Rizo (fl. 2000s–2010s), American singer, comedian and actress
José Rizo Castellón (1944–2019), a Nicaraguan politician
Rizo Šurla (1922–2003), Montenegrin photographer
Rizō Takeuchi (1907–1997), Japanese historian

Other
Gustavo Rizo Airport, a domestic airport serving Baracoa, Cuba
Mirzo Rizo, a village in Tajikistan

See also
Rizzo (disambiguation)
Rizos, a surname